Pál Dárdai may refer to:

 Pál Dárdai (footballer, born 1951) (1951–2017), Hungarian footballer and manager
 Pál Dárdai (born 1976), Hungarian footballer and manager
 Pál "Palkó" Dárdai (born 1999), German-Hungarian footballer